Marián Olejník (born 1976) is a Slovak slalom canoeist who competed at the international level from 1993 to 2007.

He won three medals at the ICF Canoe Slalom World Championships with two silvers (C2: 2005, C2 team: 1999) and a bronze (C2 team: 2006). At the European Championships he has won a total of 5 medals (2 golds, 1 silver and 2 bronzes).

His partner in the C2 boat throughout the whole of his active career was Milan Kubáň.

World Cup individual podiums

1 World Championship counting for World Cup points

References

Living people
Slovak male canoeists
1976 births
Medalists at the ICF Canoe Slalom World Championships